Fijian Americans refers to Americans citizens who are native to or descendants of people from  the  Fiji Islands. Most of Fijian Americans are of ethnic iTaukei or Indian descent. Fijian Americans are considered Pacific Islanders in the United States Census. There are 32,304 Fijian Americans living in the U.S. as of 2010, with 75% of them living in the state of California alone, especially in Sacramento County. The American Community Survey 2015-2019 counted a Fijian immigrant population of 47,000.

History
Fijians began to migrate in small numbers to the United States in the early 1950s. It was not until 1959 that Fijians began to emigrate in large numbers, emigrating 71 Fijians to the US in this year. In the 1960s more of 400 Fijians emigrated to the United States (mostly in 1968, when emigrated 368 Fijians). Since then the number of Fijian immigrants admitted to the United States has ranged from hundreds to a few thousand people each year.

During the 1970s and 1980s, the number of Fijians emigrating legally to the United States rose significantly. In the 1970s, the number increased between 1976 and 1979, rising from 132 to about 1,000 people. In the 1980s, the number rose from 712 people in 1983 to more than 1,200 people in 1987.

Later, in 1996, 1,847 more Fijians arrived in the US and, in 1997, 1,549 Fijians arrived with legal status.

Demographics
There are 32,304 Fijian Americans in the United States according to the 2010 US Census. California has the largest population of people of Fijian nationality, enumerating 19,355 residents (0.06% of the state's population). The largest Fijian communities are in Sacramento County, Sonoma County, and Alameda County. There is a sizable community of Fijian Americans in Modesto (0.6%; 1,109 residents). These communities may include Fijians of Indian descent. According to the 2015-2019 American Community Survey, there were 47K Fijian immigrants in the USA, the top counties of residence being:

1) Sacramento County, California - 11,000

2) Alameda County, California - 5,100

3) San Mateo County, California - 3,400

4) Stanislaus County, California - 3,000

5) Los Angeles County,  California - 2,500

6) San Joaquin County, California - 1,900

7) Contra Costa County, California - 1,600

8) Snohomish County, Washington - 1,300

9) Santa Clara County, California - 1,300

10) Sonoma County, California - 1,000 

Fijian Americans have several associations, including the Fiji American National Association, FANA in Hayward, California, and the Fiji American Welfare Association.

Notable people

Freddie Keiaho
Jimmy Snuka 
Tamina Snuka
Hodgy
Vijay Singh
Prerna Lal
Frankie Luvu

References 

American people of Fijian descent
Fijian American
Melanesian American
Oceanian American
Pacific Islands American